These hits topped the Dutch Top 40 in 2003 (see 2003 in music).

See also
2003 in music

2003 in the Netherlands
2003 record charts
2003